H. aculeata may refer to:

Haemaphysalis aculeata, a tick found on mouse deer
Hakea aculeata, a rare Australian plant
Helix aculeata, a synonym for the snail Acanthinula aculeata